The 2014–15 Marquette Golden Eagles men's basketball team represented Marquette University in the 2014–15 NCAA Division I men's basketball season. Their coach was Steve Wojciechowski, serving in his first year as head coach. Marquette played its home games at the BMO Harris Bradley Center in Milwaukee, Wisconsin. Marquette was a member of the Big East Conference. They finished the season 13–19, 4–14 in Big East play to finish in a tie for ninth place. They advanced to the quarterfinals of the Big East tournament where they lost to Villanova.

Preseason

Recruits

Transfer addition

Departures

Roster

Schedule

|-
!colspan=9 style="background:#00386D; color:#FDBB30;"| Exhibition
|-

|-
!colspan=9 style="background:#00386D; color:#FDBB30;"| Non-Conference Regular Season

|-
!colspan=9 style="background:#00386D; color:#FDBB30;"| Big East Conference Play

|-
!colspan=9 style="background:#00386D; color:#FDBB30;"| Big East tournament

Rankings

References

Marquette Golden Eagles men's basketball seasons
Marquette
Marquette
Marquette